Flame Vein is the first studio album by Bump of Chicken, released on March 18, 1999. One track, "Arue", was later released as a limited print single. Another, "Little Braver", was later released on the "Lamp" single as a B-side. It was re-released on April 28, 2004, as Flame Vein +1 and included the song "Battle Cry" from B-side of the "Lamp" single.

Track listing
All tracks written by Fujiwara Motoo.
 — 6:19
 — 4:03
 — 4:18
 — 5:13
 — 4:25
 — 5:35
 — 6:31
Flame Vein +1 re-release version
 — 4:37

Personnel
Fujiwara Motoo — (藤原 基央) Guitar, vocals
Masukawa Hiroaki — (増川 弘明) Guitar
Naoi Yoshifumi — (直井 由文) Bass
Masu Hideo — (升 秀夫) Drums

External links
Flame Vein at the official Bump of Chicken website.

1999 debut albums
Bump of Chicken albums
Japanese-language albums